Ibrahim Atta Daldoum (born 11 August 1991) is a Jordanian footballer who plays as a left back for Al-Faisaly and the Jordan national football team.

International career
Daldoum played his first international match against Iraq in an international friendly in Basra on 1 June 2017, which Jordan lost 1–0.

International goals

U-19 and U-23

International career statistics

Honours
Al-Faisaly
Jordan Premier League (1):2016–17
Jordan FA Cup (1):2016–17

References

External links
 

1991 births
Living people
Jordanian footballers
Jordan international footballers
Jordan youth international footballers
Jordanian people of Palestinian descent
Jordanian Pro League players
Al-Faisaly SC players
Al-Baqa'a Club players
Sportspeople from Amman
Association football defenders